Molus River is a settlement in Weldford Parish, New Brunswick on Route 116 on the Molus River.

History

Molus River had a post office named Moulies River 1867–1950 and named Molus River 1950–1970. In 1871, Molus River had a population of 150. In 1898, Molus River was a farming, fishing and lumbering settlement with 1 post office, 1 church and a population of 300.

Epsikitiáskuk is what the Mi’kmaq people of Elsipogtog First Nation called the Molus River as seen on old land grant documents at Provincial Archives New Brunswick.

A possible source for the word Molus is from the French language spoken by Acadian living in the Richibucto River area, with the word "moluёs" being a French word for a tidal flat mussel, a type of shellfish commonly found on muddy beaches along the river.

For a period from about 1850–1900 the name on maps was often spelled Moulies River and moulies is a type of coal shale that was harvested during the days of coal mining operations along the Coal Branch River, which is another tributary of the Richibucto River Estuary. There is also an old oral tradition that the river may have been named for a Henry Molus, an early settler or explorer in the area.

Notable people

See also
List of communities in New Brunswick

References

Settlements in New Brunswick
Communities in Kent County, New Brunswick